Lécera is a municipality located in the Campo de Belchite comarca, province of Zaragoza, Aragon, Spain. According to the 2004 census (INE), the municipality has a population of 777 inhabitants.

History
Lécera is known for the Treaty of Lécera (Tratado de Lécera or Convenio de Segura) between Generals Cabrera and Van-Halen that led to an exchange of prisoners of war in the First Carlist War.

References

Municipalities in the Province of Zaragoza